Ismene nutans is a plant species in the family Amaryllidaceae. It is native to the Andes.

References 

Flora of Peru
Amaryllidoideae